Janice Pottker is a Potomac, Maryland, author. She has a Ph.D. in sociology from Columbia University. She has lectured for the Smithsonian Institution, for the Franklin D. Roosevelt Presidential Library and Museum and for the Corcoran Gallery of Art.

Controversy
Around 1990, she wrote an article for Regardie's, a magazine that covered the Washington business area, about Feld Entertainment. The CEO of Feld, Kenneth Jeffrey Feld paid Clair George and his assistant Robert Eringer $2.3 million to have them and their associates wiretap, bug and spy on Pottker.

Publications

References

External links
Janice Pottker homepage

American non-fiction writers
Writers from Maryland
Columbia University alumni
People from Potomac, Maryland
Year of birth missing (living people)
Place of birth missing (living people)
Living people